Sher Shah–Kot Addu Branch Line is one of several branch lines in Pakistan, operated and maintained by Pakistan Railways. The line begins at Sher Shah Junction on the Karachi–Peshawar Railway Line and ends at Kot Addu Junction on the Kotri–Attock Railway Line.

The line serves as an important link between the Karachi–Peshawar Railway Line (Main Line 1) and Kotri–Attock Railway Line (Main Line 2).

Stations
 Sher Shah Junction
 Chenab West Bank
 Muzaffargarh
 Kotla Leghari (Closed)
 Budh
 Mahmud Kot
 Gurmani
 Sanawan
 Kot Addu Junction

See also
 Kotri–Attock Railway Line
 Karachi–Peshawar Railway Line
 Railway lines in Pakistan

References

5 ft 6 in gauge railways in Pakistan
Railway stations on Sher Shah–Kot Addu Branch Line